Kumbo Strikers is a Cameroonian football club based in Kumbo. They are a member of the Cameroonian Football Federation.

The team was founded in 1992 and play in Cameroon Second Division.

Their home stadium is Kumbo Municipal Stadium and they are nicknamed the "KSFC".

Honours

 Cameroon Cup: 1
 2000

Super Coupe Roger Milla: 1
 2000

Performance in CAF competitions
2001 African Cup Winners' Cup: Semi-final

External links
Futbol24
Wikipedia.fr Page
Leffortcamerounais

References

Football clubs in Cameroon
Association football clubs established in 1992
1992 establishments in Cameroon
Sports clubs in Cameroon